The 1920 Anhalt state election was held on 6 June 1920 to elect the 36 members of the Landtag of the Free State of Anhalt.

Results

References 

Anhalt
Elections in Saxony-Anhalt